The 2021 IHF World Women's Handball Championship, the 25th event by the International Handball Federation, was held in Spain from 1 to 19  December 2021. On 18 October 2018, at a congress in Doha, Qatar, the IHF announced that the World Championship would be expanded from 24 teams to 32 teams from 2021 onwards.

The Netherlands were the defending champions after winning for the first time in 2019. However, they finished third in their main round group and failed to qualify for the quarterfinals.

Norway defeated France to win their fourth title. Denmark captured the bronze medal by winning against Spain.

Bidding process
Spain and Hungary bid for the right to organise the 2021 Women's World Handball Championship. The International Handball Federation decided that the voting process would take place during the 2017 World Men's Handball Championship.

The Spanish bid included the following six host cities and venues:

The President of the Royal Spanish Handball Federation confirmed that full support is granted by the Olympic Movement, Spanish government and the handball community. The Spanish government guaranteed the introduction of all necessary measures so that the event could be celebrated in a full security setting, with special attention paid to key infrastructures for the staging of the competitions and to IHF operations, its subsidiaries and delegations from different countries.

The Hungarian bid included the following six host cities and venues:

The 2021 Women's World Handball Championship was awarded to Spain by a secret ballot of members of the IHF Council.

Venues
The tournament is being played in the following venues: Llíria, Torrevieja, Castelló and Granollers as the final four venue.

Qualification

1. On 9 December 2019, the World Anti-Doping Agency (WADA) banned Russia from all international sport for a period of four years, after the Russian government was found to have tampered with laboratory data that it provided to WADA in January 2019 as a condition of the Russian Anti-Doping Agency being reinstated. Russia later filed an appeal to the Court of Arbitration for Sport (CAS) against the WADA decision. After reviewing the case on appeal, CAS ruled on 17 December 2020 to reduce the penalty that WADA had placed on Russia. Instead of banning Russia from sporting events, the ruling allowed Russian sportspeople to participate at the Olympics and other international events, but for a period of two years, the team cannot use the Russian name, flag, or anthem and must present themselves as "Neutral Athlete" or "Neutral Team". The ruling does allow for team uniforms to display "Russia" on the uniform as well as the use of the Russian flag colors within the uniform's design, although the name should be up to equal predominance as the "Neutral Athlete/Team" designation. Like the men's team, the Russian women's team played under the alternative name of the sport's domestic governing body, the Russian Handball Federation.

2. Since 2018 countries from Oceania (Australia and New Zealand) are participating in the Asian Championships: if one of them finishes within the top five, it qualifies for the World Championship. Otherwise the place transfers to the wild card spot.

3. Since Oceania did not register a team for the upcoming Asian qualification event, the IHF Council awarded two Wild Cards for the 2021 IHF Women’s World Championship in Spain, namely to the National Federations of Slovakia and Poland.

4. As the 2021 Asian tournament was only played with 11 teams instead of 12, only five teams qualified and a wild card was granted to China.

Qualified teams

Draw
The draw took place on 12 August 2021 at 22:00 in Castellón, Spain.

Seeding
The seeding was announced on 8 August 2021. As organizer, Spain had the right to choose their group. The Asian, North and South American teams were not known at the time of the draw.

Referees
18 referee pairs were selected on 12 October 2021.

Squads

Each team consists of up to 18 players, of whom 16 may be fielded for each match.

Preliminary round
All times are local (UTC+1).

Group A

Group B

Group C

Group D

Group E

Group F

Group G

Group H

Presidents Cup

Group I

Group II

31st place game

29th place game

27th place game

25th place game

Main round
All points obtained in the preliminary round against teams that advanced as well, were carried over.

Group I

Group II

Group III

Group IV

Final round

Bracket

Quarterfinals

Semifinals

Third place game

Final

Final ranking and awards
Places 1 to 4 and 25 to 32 were decided by play-off or knock-out. The losers of the quarter finals were ranked 5th to 8th according to the places in the main round, points gained and goal difference. Teams finishing third in the main round were ranked 9th to 12th, teams finishing fourth in the main round were ranked 13th to 16th, teams finishing fifth in the main round were ranked 17th to 20th and teams ranked sixth were ranked 21st to 24th. In case of a tie in points gained, the goal difference of the main round was taken into account, then number of goals scored. If teams were still equal, number of points gained in the preliminary round were considered followed by the goal difference and then number of goals scored in the preliminary round.

All-Star team
The all-star team and MVP was announced on 19 December 2021.

Statistics

Top goalscorers

Top goalkeepers

Top assists

Top blocks

Notes

References

External links

IHF website

2021
World Championship, 2021
World Championship, Women
2021 in Spanish women's sport
2021
World Championship, 2021
December 2021 sports events in Spain